Don't Laugh Now was Ray Stevens' nineteenth studio album and his third and final for RCA Records, released in 1982. The front of the album cover shows Stevens looking pensive and holding a comedy mask, while the back cover shows Stevens smiling and holding a tragedy mask. Two singles were lifted from the album: "Written Down in My Heart" and "Where the Sun Don't Shine," both of which became minor country hits.

Track listing

Personnel 
 Produced by Bob Montgomery and Ray Stevens
 Tracks 1, 3-7 & 9 arranged by Ray Stevens
 Tracks 2, 8 & 10 arranged by Ron Oates
 Engineer – Stuart Keathley
 Recorded at Ray Stevens Studio (Nashville, Tennessee).
 Mastered at Masterfonics (Nashville, Tennessee).
 Photography – Graham Henman
 Art Direction – Barnes & Company

Musicians
 Ray Stevens – vocals 
 Ron Oates – keyboards 
 Ken Bell – acoustic guitars 
 Larry Byrom – electric guitars 
 John Clausi – electric guitars 
 Kenny Mims – electric guitars 
 Michael Spriggs – electric guitars 
 Reggie Young – electric guitars 
 Hal Rugg – steel guitar
 Bob Wray – bass 
 James Stroud – drums 
 Nashville String Machine – strings 
 The Cherry Sisters – backing vocals

Chart performance

Singles

1982 albums
Ray Stevens albums
RCA Records albums